Comanche Electric Cooperative, Inc. is a non-profit rural electric utility cooperative headquartered in Comanche, Texas, United States of America.

The cooperative was organized in 1938 through the Rural Electrification Act and serves portions of seven counties in the state of Texas, in a territory generally surrounding Comanche. It was the first REA electric cooperative to have an affiliated women's club.

Comanche is a member of the Brazos Electric Power Cooperative, a generation and transmission electric cooperative. Currently the cooperative has over 4,791 miles of line and 15,886 meters.

References

External links
Comanche Electric Cooperative

1938 establishments in Texas
Companies based in Texas
Electric cooperatives in Texas
Brown County, Texas
Callahan County, Texas
Comanche County, Texas
Eastland County, Texas
Mills County, Texas
Shackelford County, Texas
Stephens County, Texas
Organizations established in 1938